CoRoT-17b is a transiting exoplanet found by the CoRoT space telescope in 2011.

It is a hot Jupiter-sized planet orbiting a G2V star with Te = 5740 K, M = 1.04 M☉, R = 1.59 R☉, and near-solar metallicity. It has an estimated age between 9.7 and 11.7 Gyr.

References

Hot Jupiters
Transiting exoplanets
Exoplanets discovered in 2011
17b